The aftermath of the Korean War set the tone for Cold War tension between all the superpowers. The Korean War was important in the development of the Cold War, as it showed that the two superpowers, United States and Soviet Union, could fight a "limited war" in a third country. The "limited war" or "proxy war" strategy was a feature of conflicts such as the Vietnam War and the Soviet War in Afghanistan, as well as wars in Angola, Greece, and the Middle East.

The Korean War was the first war in which the United Nations (UN) participated outside the Western world. Some commentators argued that it showed that the UN was a powerful organization for helping to keep world peace. The UN Command in South Korea is still functional.

Around June 1950, the Korean War became an international crisis, as it made communist and capitalist countries around the world go against each other. By the end of World War II, the Soviet Union sought to spread communism to other nations and did so by providing political, logistical, and diplomatic support and assisted in the plans to invade South Korea. The Soviets provided military training for North Korean and Chinese troops.

In response, the United States, fearing that the Soviets would control and spread communism to the entire Korean Peninsula and South Pacific, sent troops into South Korea to support the its military forces. Those actions quickly escalated into other countries. The United Nations (UN) supported the south, and China supported the north. Both sides got involved in the conflict.

The war devastated both North and South Korea. Both suffered major damage to their economies and infrastructure, as a result of bombings, artillery strikes and loss of life, including im military personnel and civilians.

In the aftermath of the war, the United States funneled significant aid to South Korea under the auspices of the United Nations Korean Reconstruction Agency (UNKRA). Concomitantly, North Korean reconstruction was assisted by "fraternal socialist nations:" the Soviet Union and China. In the years immediately following the war, North Korea's growth rate of total industrial output exceeded South Korea's and averaged 39% between 1953 and 1960.

Australia 

From 1950 to 1953, 17,000 Australians in the Army, Navy and Air Force fought as part of the United Nations multinational forces.

Australian troops participated in two major battles in 1951. The first, on April 22, 1951, Chinese forces attacked the Kapyong valley and forced South Korean and Australian troops into retreat; other UN troops, including the Australian, were ordered to halt the attack. After a night of fierce fighting, during which the allied positions were overrun, the Australians counterattacked and recaptured their positions, stalling the Chinese advance. The Australians suffered very few casualties. For their contribution to this action, 3 RAR (Royal Australian Regiment) was awarded a U.S. Presidential Citation.

Australian soldiers also participated in Operation Commando, an attack against a Chinese-held position in a bend of the Imjin River, a river running north–south that crosses the 38th parallel north just above Seoul. The attack began on October 3, 1951, and after five days of heavy fighting the Chinese withdrew. Twenty Australians were killed in the battle and 89 were wounded.

As the war continued, several other nations grew less willing to contribute more ground troops. Australia, however, increased its troop strength in Korea.

After the war ended, Australians remained in Korea for four years as military observers. Australia gained political and security benefits, the most significant being the signing of the ANZUS Treaty with the United States and New Zealand.

Canada

Canada sent 29,791 troops to the war, with 7,000 more remaining to supervise the ceasefire until the end of 1955. Of these 1,558 became casualties, including 516 deaths, most of them through combat. Canada's participation included a brigade of troops, eight naval vessels, and 22 pilots for U.S. jet squadrons.

The first Canadian aid to the UN forces came from the Royal Canadian Navy. These ships supported the assault at Inchon and played an especially important role in the evacuation. Canadian ships also kept up the blockade on North Korean waters and protected coastal villages from attack.

The Canadian army also helped UN forces repulse and defend major positions from Chinese attack.

The Korean War was the last major conflict Canadian forces participated in until the 1991 Persian Gulf War, and the last major combat by ground troops until 2002 in Afghanistan. Canada played a minor role in the fighting in Cyprus in 1974 and in the Balkans at Medak Pocket in the 1990s.

The Canadian military was revitalized as a result of the Korean War. A changeover to U.S.-designed weapons and equipment had been planned for the 1950s, but the emergency in Korea forced the use of war stocks of British-designed weapons from World War II. In the late 1950s, Canada adopted a variety of weapons.

Colombia

Being the only Latin American country to participate in the conflict, Colombia provided ground and naval support to South Korea. Under their newly elected president Laureano Gomez sought greater economic relations with the United States to ease previous tensions of anti-U.S. sentiments during WWII. The first Battalion was an all volunteer force of over 1000 personnel in June 1951 and approximately 5000 sailors and soldiers provided assistance between 1951-1954 to include Colombia's only frigate at the time, the Almirante.

France

At a time of political difficulties due to lack of cabinet members and a prime minister, the French government eventually provided military support to South Korea by sending over the French Army's bataillon français De l'ONU of over 3000 soldiers and sailors. This Battalion played a significant role in defending the 38th parallel on the Korean Peninsula and the South Korean Capitol City Seoul between 1950 and 1954. The French at the time were worried that if they failed in their efforts it would harm future relations between them, Indochina and the UN.

Greece

Almost 5000 troops from the Greece Expeditionary Force, from its air force and army, were provided in response to the UN's appeal for more assistance at the beginning of the Korean War. It would seem strange that such a small country with insignificant ties with South Korea would provide such a large amount of support during the war. However, Greece had international sympathy for Korea due to its own history of a civil war against communism. Another reason why Greece sent a large amount troops was because of a long rivalry with Turkey as Greece also sought to improve relations with the UN and the United States.

India

During this time India was newly independent from British rule and viewed the Korean conflict as a motivation and also a threat. During the cold war New Delhi became more concerned of India's well-being due to the spread of communism and the constant support of the USSR and China to North Korea. These events could lead to communist influence getting to India. India took action in the form of medical supplies, personnel, and a custodian force used to look after enemy prisoners of war (EPOW's)

Due to the nature of the conflict and it's nuclear capabilities India decided to play a more conservative role in assisting the rest of the UN and South Korea. India also contributed in containing the war and not allowing it to escalate by working alongside the UN Security Council resolutions to provide a status quo to avoid prolonged conflict. India also supported the UN Security Council in the avocation of the power of unity among the major powers to work together towards a solution of the conflict.

Japan

As American occupation armies were dispatched to Korean peninsula, Japan's security became problematic. Under United States guidance, Japan established Reserved Police, later the Japan Self-Defense Forces (自衛隊). The signing of the Treaty of Peace with Japan (日本国との平和条約; popularly known as the Treaty of San Francisco) was also hastened to return Japan back into international communities. In the eyes of some American policy makers, the non-belligerency clause in the Constitution was already being considered a "mistake" by 1953.

Economically, Japan was able to benefit vastly from the war, and the Korean War greatly helped the rise of Japan's economy and its development into a world power. American requirements for supplies were organized through a Special Procurements system, which allowed for local purchases without the complex Pentagon procurement system. Over $3.5 billion was spent on Japanese companies, peaking at $809 million in 1953, and the zaibatsu went from being distrusted to being encouraged. Among those who thrived not only on orders from the military but also through American industrial experts, including W. Edwards Deming were Mitsui, Mitsubishi, and Sumitomo. Japanese manufacturing grew by 50% between March 1950 and 1951, and by 1952, pre-war standards of living were reached and output was twice the level of 1949. Becoming an independent country after the Treaty of San Francisco saved Japan from the burden of expense of the occupation forces.

During the war, 200,000 to 400,000 Koreans fled to Japan relying on relatives already living in Japan to provide them with shelters and necessary paperwork to live legally. They joined with those having fled from Jeju and formed the largest post-World War II Korean population group in Japan. While they initially had no strong political alignment, they were eventually split into factions supporting either North or South Korea with few holding on to the ideal of unified Korea.

People's Republic of China 

The PRC had sent some of its best units to join the war. Although the People's Liberation Army (PLA) had some initial success, losses (both on the battlefield as well as in material and casualties) exposed the PLA's  weaknesses in firepower, air support, logistics, and communication. As a result, the PLA was given a new mandate to modernize and professionalize itself.  This ran counter to the PLA's previous mandate that put dogma before expertise and modernization.  The commander of the PLA's forces in Korea during the war, marshal Peng Dehuai, was made the government's first minister of defense to implement the changes and reforms such as modernization of weaponry, training and discipline, the rank system, and conscription.

China successfully prevented the South Korean and U.S. militaries from establishing a presence on its Manchurian border. At that time, Manchuria, especially Liaoning – the Chinese province north of the Yalu River – was China's most important industrial center. Protecting the Manchurian industrial zone was one of the major reasons China entered the war. Furthermore, by supporting the North Korean state, China obtained more than 300 km of strategic buffer zone from the U.S. which would avoid the military spending necessary to protect its Korean border for the next fifty years.

On the other hand, this meant China lost the opportunity to reunify Taiwan. Initially, the United States had abandoned the KMT and expected that Taiwan would fall to Beijing anyway, so the basic U.S. policy was to "wait and see" on the assumption that Taiwan's fall to Communist China was inevitable. However, the North Korean invasion of South Korea, in the context of the Cold War, meant U.S. President Truman intervened again and dispatched the Seventh Fleet to "neutralize" the Formosa (Taiwan) Strait.

During the war, over an estimate number of 21,800 Chinese troops were taken prisoner by the Allies. After the war, they were given a chance to return to the People's Republic of China or to go to the Republic of China (Taiwan). Over two thirds of the entire group chose to go to Taiwan for the fears of government reprisal, consequently defecting to the Army of the Republic of China.

The war also partly contributed to the decline of Sino-Soviet relations. Although the Chinese had their own reasons to enter the war, mentioned above, the view that the Soviets had used them as proxies was shared by the Western bloc. MacArthur was a notable exception, dissenting from this prevailing view in his "Old Soldiers Never Die" speech. China had to use a Soviet loan, which had been originally intended to rebuild their destroyed economy, to pay for Soviet arms.

From official Chinese sources, PVA Korean War casualty figures break down as follows: 114,084 killed in action; 380,000 total wounded in action; 70,000 died of wounds or sickness; and 25,621 missing.

Republic of China (Taiwan) 

Korea played an important role in sustaining the ROC's economic stability. Until the war in Korea, the U.S. had largely abandoned the Nationalist government of Generalissimo Chiang Kai-shek, whose forces had retreated to Taiwan after their defeat at the hands of Mao Zedong's Communists in the Chinese Civil War. Indeed, the U.S. had little involvement in that conflict, beyond supplying surplus material to the Nationalists. However, the PRC's involvement in the Korean War rendered any U.S. policy that would have allowed Taiwan to fall under PRC control untenable.  This saw the abandonment of the American policy to let Taiwan join the communist Chinese state, the policy which existed prior to the war. Truman's decision to send American warships to the Formosa Strait as well as an increase in aid in order to deter the PRC from making any attempt to invade Taiwan, after doing nothing to prevent the Nationalists' mainland defeat in the first place, is evidence of this.

Also, the anti-communist atmosphere in the West in response to the Korean War contributed to the unwillingness to diplomatically recognize the People's Republic of China until the 1970s. In that time, the Republic of China (ROC) was recognized by the U.S. as 'the' legitimate Chinese government, and that in turn allowed Taiwan to develop politically, militarily, and economically. The result has been that, today, any effort by the PRC to invade the island, or otherwise coerce the people there into an arrangement of political unity with the Communist controlled mainland, would be difficult at best to accomplish, and may be impossible without a great deal of bloodshed. While economic ties between the PRC and ROC have grown immensely since the 1990s, thus achieving a degree of interdependency that would have been unimaginable even twenty years ago; political diplomacy between the ROC and mainland China remains strained, and successive governments in Taiwan have consistently, if sometimes obliquely, signaled their determination to remain independent for the foreseeable future.

Nevertheless, the defectors arrived in Taiwan on January 23, 1954, and were immediately celebrated as "Anti-Communist volunteers". The ROC government soon declared January 23 as World Freedom Day in their honor.

Soviet Union 

The war was a political disaster for the Soviet Union. Its central objective, the unification of the Korean peninsula under the Kim Il-Sung regime, was not achieved. Boundaries of both parts of Korea remained practically unchanged. Furthermore, relations with communist ally China were seriously and permanently spoiled, leading to the Sino-Soviet split that lasted until the collapse of the Soviet Union in 1991.

The United States' strong resistance to the invasion may have prevented a Soviet intervention in Yugoslavia during the Tito–Stalin split. The war, meanwhile, united the countries within the capitalist bloc: the Korean War accelerated the conclusion of a peace agreement between the U.S. and Japan, the warming of West Germany's relations with other western countries, creation of military and political blocs ANZUS (1951) and SEATO (1954). However, because of the war, the authority of the Soviet State grew, which showed in its readiness to interfere in developing countries of the Third World, many of which after the Korean war went down the socialist path of development, after selecting the Soviet Union as their patron.

It is generally assumed that the war was a heavy burden on the national economy of the Soviet Union, which was still suffering from the effects of World War II. Expenditures for defense certainly grew more sharply than they otherwise would have. However, it has been claimed that in fact much of the payment for the Soviet contribution to the war effort was made by China (which perhaps goes some way towards explaining the eventual split between the two countries). Also, some historians believe, instead of an obvious political disaster, the war actually may have served to preserve the military power of the Soviet Union, while western forces became relatively broken.

Despite the expenses and regardless of who paid them, it must also be said that the Korean War provided approximately thirty thousand Soviet military personnel valuable experience in waging local wars. The conflict also allowed the Soviets the opportunity to test several new forms of armament, in particular the MiG-15 combat aircraft. Furthermore, numerous models of American military equipment were captured, which made it possible for Soviet engineers and scientists to reverse engineer American technology, and use what they learned for the development of new forms of their own armaments. According to declassified Soviet documents released after the fall of the USSR, Stalin himself may have been the main obstacle for peace in Korea specifically because of the intelligence gathered on the American war machine, and the testing of new Soviet military equipment during the conflict.

Turkey 
During World War II, Turkey maintained a neutral stance. It was decided by the Allies at the Second Cairo Conference that maintaining Turkey's neutrality would serve their interests, by blocking the Axis from reaching the strategic oil reserves of the Middle East. Unfortunately, and although Turkey eventually declared war on the Axis Powers in 1945, this decision had the side-effect of leaving the country somewhat isolated in the diplomatic arena after the war. By the beginning of the 1950s, Turkey was under pressure from the Soviet Union on territorial issues, particularly regarding the control of the Turkish Straits. Looking for an ally against the Soviets, Turkey sought to join the NATO alliance, and the Korean War was viewed as an opportunity to show Turkey's good intention.

Turkey was one of the larger participants in the U.N. alliance, committing nearly 5,500 troops. The Turkish Brigade, which operated under the U.S. 25th Infantry Division, assisted in protecting the supply lines of U.N. forces which advanced towards North Korea. However, it was the Battles of Kunu-ri and Kumyanjangni that earned the Turkish Brigade a reputation and the praise of U.N. forces. Because of their actions in these battles (721 KIA, 168 MIA, and 2111 WIA), a monument was created in Seoul in the memory of the Turkish soldiers who fought in Korea.

Yet Turkey's involvement in the Korean War was a controversial topic in Turkey at the time, and continues to be so today. First, while sending troops to Korea earned Turkey the respect of the West, it was also the beginning of more overt clashes with the Eastern Bloc. Second, the Prime Minister of Turkey Adnan Menderes was criticized for sending troops without asking the parliament first. Last, while Turkey's performance in the Korean War is considered by many citizens as one of the most noble episodes of the country's recent history, some also believe that sending the country's soldiers to die for the interests of the "imperialist powers" was one of the most misguided foreign policy decisions ever made by the Turkish Republic.

Nevertheless, Turkey's entrance into the war as part of the U.N. command did indeed have a great impact on earning a place in NATO. Thus, Turkey can be considered a country which benefited from the Korean War.

United Kingdom
Approximately 100,000 British troops fought in the Korean war. Their significant involvement was the Battle of the Imjin River against Chinese soldiers. 600 soldiers of the British Army combated a force of 30,000 Chinese troops crossing the Imjin River in Korea in 1951. At the end of the battle 10,000 Chinese troops had fallen. The U.K. only suffered about 59 casualties. This battle was a turning point in the war as it stopped the Chinese advance. The Gloucester Valley Battle Monument is a memorial for British soldiers killed at Solma-Ri, South Korea. 1,078 British soldiers died fighting in the Korean war.

United States 

The Defense Department estimated that the United States spent  (equivalent to $B in ) on the Korean War. The American defense budget had nearly quadrupled during this period, and high levels of expenditures were even maintained after 1953.

President Truman declared a state of national emergency at the outset of the war in December 1950 during which the penalties under numerous federal statutes were automatically escalated. Although the emergency has long since abated, the federal courts have continued to enforce those penalties into the 21st century for acts that occurred while the emergency was at its height.

Racial integration efforts in the U.S. military began during the Korean War, where African Americans fought in integrated units for the first time. President Truman signed Executive Order 9981 on July 26, 1948, calling on the armed forces to provide equal treatment and opportunity for black servicemen. The extent to which Truman's 1948 orders were carried out varied among the various branches of the military, with segregated units still in deployment at the start of the war, and eventually being integrated towards the end of the war. The last large segregated operational unit was the U.S. 24th Infantry Regiment which was deactivated on October 1, 1951.

There has been some confusion over the previously reported number of 54,589 Korean War deaths. In 1993, this number was divided by the Defense Department into 33,686 battle deaths, 2,830 non-battle deaths, and 17,730 deaths of Defense Department personnel outside the Korean theatre. There were also 8,142 U.S. personnel listed as Missing In Action (MIA) during the war. U.S. casualties in the war are fewer than in the Vietnam War, but they occurred over three years as opposed to 15 years (1960 to 1975) in Vietnam. However, advances in medical services such as the Mobile Army Surgical Hospital and the use of rapid transport of the wounded to them such as with helicopters led to a lower death rate for U.N. forces than in previous wars.

For service during the Korean War, the U.S. military issued the Korean Service Medal. However, many still-living Korean War veterans claim that their country tends to neglect the remembrance of this war. With more overt displays made for World War I, World War II, the Vietnam War, the Persian Gulf War, the War in Afghanistan, and the Iraq war, the Korean War has come to be dubbed by some as the "Forgotten war" or the "Unknown War." As a partial remedy, the Korean War Veterans Memorial was built in Washington, D.C., and dedicated to veterans of the war on July 27, 1995.

The U.S. still maintains a heavy military presence in Korea, as part of the effort to uphold the Korean Armistice Agreement between South and North Korea. A special service decoration, known as the Korea Defense Service Medal, is authorized for U.S. service members who today serve a tour of duty in Korea.

Western Europe 

The outbreak of the war convinced Western leaders of the growing threat of international communism. The United States began to encourage Western European countries, including West Germany, to contribute to their own defense, though this was perceived as a threat by its neighbors, especially France. West Germany had not fought in the Korean war, as it had been demilitarized.  As the war continued, however, opposition to rearmament lessened and China's entry in the war caused France to revise its position towards Bundeswehr German rearmament. To contain the situation French officials proposed the creation of the European Defense Community (EDC), a supranational organization, under the leadership of the North Atlantic Treaty Organization (NATO).

The end of the war reduced the perceived communist threat, and thus reduced the necessity of such an organization. The French Parliament postponed the ratification of the EDC Treaty indefinitely. This rejection in the French Parliament was caused by Gaullist fears that the creation of the EDC threatened France's national sovereignty. The EDC was not ratified, and the initiative collapsed in August 1955.

See also
Korean conflict
Neutral Nations Supervisory Commission
Korean DMZ Conflict (1966–69)
Recovery of US human remains from the Korean War

References

Further reading